The 2018 All Africa Men's and Women's Team Badminton Championships is a continental stage tournament of Thomas and Uber Cups, and also to crown the best men's and women's badminton team in Africa. This tournament will be held in Algiers, Algeria between 12 and 15 February 2018.

Medalists

Tournament 
The All Africa Men's and Women's Team Badminton Championships officially crowns the best male and female national badminton teams in Africa and at the same time works as the African qualification event towards the 2018 Thomas & Uber Cup finals. 19 teams consisting of 12 men's team and 7 women's team have entered the tournament.

Venue 
Venue of this tournament is Salle OMS Hacène Harcha Arena, in Algiers, Algeria.

Men's team
The host country, Algeria has been crowned the champion in the men's team event. The Algeria team beating Nigeria with the score 3–2, and Nigeria settle for the silver medal. It is the first time for Algeria to win the competition, and also will be the first time for the team to participate at the Thomas Cup final. The men's team bronze goes to Mauritius and Ghana. The team lose in the semifinal round to Algeria and Nigeria, both with the score 3–1 respectively.

Group stage

Group A

Group B

Group C

Group D

Knockout stage

Women's team
The Mauritian women's team clinched the title and won the gold medal after beating the flagship country of African badminton, Nigeria. Under the coach from Malaysia, Krishnan Yogendran, Mauritius defeating Nigeria with the score 3–0. The Egypt and Algeria women's team were placed third in the competition and won the bronze medal. Both teams defeated in the semifinal by Nigeria and Mauritius with the score 3–2 respectively.

Group stage

Group A

Group B

Knockout stage

References

External links
Tournament draws

Africa Continental Team Badminton Championships
All Africa Men's and Women's Team Badminton Championships
Badminton tournaments in Algeria
2018 in Algerian sport
All Africa Men's and Women's Team Badminton Championships